Abdul Majid Mahmoud was held in extrajudicial detention in the United States's Guantanamo Bay detention camps, in Cuba.
His Guantanamo Internment Serial Number was 624.

Majid Mehmood was transferred to Pakistan on November 18, 2003.

McClatchy News Service interview

On June 15, 2008, the McClatchy News Service published a series of articles based on interviews with 66 former Guantanamo captives.
Abdul Majid Mahmoud
was one of the former captives who had an article profiling him.

Abdul Majid Mahmoud said he was captured by Afghans in December 2001, held in brutal conditions, for four months.
He had shrapnel wounds when he was captured, but told his Afghan interrogators that he had traveled to Afghanistan merely to attend a wedding.

He said one of his Afghan captors told him he was being sold to the Americans for $5000.

He said he decided to tell his American interrogators the truth, that he had been recruited by the Taliban in Karachi.  
He said he was completely truthful during the four or five months he was held in the Kandahar detention facility.  However, he noted, he was not treated any better than captives who continued to lie to their interrogators, and was sent to Guantanamo for further interrogation.

In 2003, he was force-fed when he joined a hunger strike to protest guards desecrating the koran.

The McClatchy reporters imply that Abdul Majid Mahmoud spent twenty months in Guantanamo.  However, the DoD's records indicate he only spent about thirteen months total in US custody.  He spent a further year in Pakistani detention after his repatriation.

See also

Qur'an desecration
Force-feeding

References

External links
McClatchy News Service - video
Guantanamo Inmate Database - Abdul Majid Mahmoud
Report on ex-Guantánamo prisoners reveals systematic abuse and chronic failures of intelligence Andy Worthington

Living people
1979 births
Guantanamo detainees known to have been released